Stefano Secco (born 1973 in Milan, Italy) is an Italian opera singer and actor.

Biography 

Born in Milan in 1973, Secco began his studies under the direction of professor Alberto Soresina and graduated in percussion with Tullio De Piscopo.

He also attended particular courses given by Leyla Gencer and Renata Scotto.

In January 2016 he performed at Venice New Year's Concert with Nadine Sierra.

Career 

 Simon Boccanegra de Verdi, Opéra de Paris (2006), Grand théâtre du Liceu (2008)
 Don Carlos, Opéra de Paris (2008)
 Rigoletto, performing as the Duke of Mantua, Opéra de Paris (2008)
 Hoffmann, Opéra de Paris (2012)
 Carmen, Don José, La Fenice, Venice (2013)
 Requiem, Budapest (2013)

Filmography 

 2009: Tosca, acting Mario Cavaradossi
 2009: Macbeth, acting Macduff
 2012: The Tales of Hoffmann

References

External links
 Official website of Stefano Secco

1970 births
Italian operatic tenors
Singers from Milan
Living people
21st-century Italian male  opera singers